Greta Electric Scooters is an Indian electric two-wheeler manufacturer, based in Gujarat. Its manufacturing plants are located in Gujarat and Haryana.

The company is the subsidiary of Raj Electromotives Pvt. Ltd.

History
Greta Electric Scooters was founded in 2019 by Raj Mehta. The Gujarat-based EV startup is engaged in the manufacturing of electric scooters.

In 2021, Greta opened its first international showroom in Nepal, and e-scooters are under road test in Europe.

As per the reports, Greta Electric Scooters run 100 Kilometers in a single charge.

The company has the first highest EV Showroom at Ladakh, 3500 meters above sea level.

References 

Electric scooters
Electric vehicle infrastructure developers